Kompas is an Indonesian national newspaper from Jakarta which was founded on 28 June 1965. The paper is published by PT Kompas Media Nusantara, which is a part of Kompas Gramedia Group. Its head office is located at the Kompas Multimedia Towers, Tanah Abang, Central Jakarta.

The paper manages an online portal kompas.id, which contains updated news and the digital subscription version of the paper, while Kompas Gramedia also manages another editorially-separated portal kompas.com. Kompas daily is one of two newspapers in Indonesia audited by the International Federation of Audit Bureau of Circulations.

History 
The paper was first suggested by General Ahmad Yani, then commander of the Indonesian Army, to Frans Seda, a government minister and leader of the Catholic Party. Yani encouraged Seda to publish a newspaper that was representative of the Catholic Party faction, in order to counter the communist propaganda spearheaded by the PKI.

Seda sounded out the idea to his friends, P.K. Ojong and Jakob Oetama. Ojong subsequently agreed to undertake the project and Oetama became its first editor-in-chief. Later the newspaper's mission was changed to become one that is independent and free from any political factions.

The publication was initially named Bentara Rakyat (People's Herald). At President Sukarno's suggestion, it was renamed to Kompas, for the direction-finding instrument.

Kompas began publication on 28 June 1965 from an office in central Jakarta. Its circulation grew from initial circulation of 4,800 copies in 1965 to around 500,000 in 2014. Since 1969, it has been the largest national Indonesian-language newspaper in Indonesia. Kompas reached its peak circulation in 2004, when its daily circulation reached some 530,000 copies, and its Sunday edition, 610,000 copies. Readership totaled some 2.25 million. In 2014 its circulation reached 507,000, with 66% circulating in Greater Jakarta.

Like many major daily newspapers, Kompas is divided into three major parts: a front section containing national and international news, a business and finance section, and a sports section.

Kompas features the Panji Koming and Benny & Mice (until 2010) comic strips every Sunday.

In 1988, Kompas was the first newspaper to trial sending news stories via an internet connection, during the time the internet was unknown in Indonesia. Internet news delivery was first done by the newspaper's sport division in September 1988, when covering the Seoul Olympics that year. In 1993, while covering the Southeast Asian Games in Singapore, Kompas was the first Indonesian newspaper to send a picture via the internet.

On 14 September 1995 Kompas launched its internet news division and website, Kompas Online. Initially the website used .co.id domain before switching to .com domain a year later. In 1998, Kompas Online was rebranded as Kompas Cyber Media, and rebranded again in 2008 as Kompas.com. Aside from the rebranding, the internet news division still uses www.kompas.com domain to this day.

Circulation
Kompas began its first issue with a circulation of 4,800 copies. Since 1969, the newspaper dominates sales nationwide. In 2004, daily circulation reached 530,000 copies, special edition of Sunday to even reach 610,000 copies. Readers of Kompas are expected to reach 2.25 million people in Indonesia. Kompas print edition had an average circulation of  500,000 copies per day, and the average number of readers reached 1,850,000 people per day. 

The paper is distributed to all parts of Indonesia. With a circulation on average of 500,000 copies per day and reaching 600,000 copies for the Sunday edition, Kompas has the largest circulation of any newspaper in southeast Asia. Kompas was the first print media in Asia that made its own digital newspaper version for iPad.

Regional sections
The first regional section included in the paper was for East Java in 2003. This was followed by Central Java, Yogyakarta, West Java, and two other Sumatran regional sections. However, in January 2011, the newspaper closed down regional sections and returned to a uniform edition nationwide. No clear reason was given for the action.

References

External links

 Official site

Indonesian press
Newspapers published in Jakarta
Publications established in 1965
1965 establishments in Indonesia
Kompas Gramedia Group